This list of museums in Alaska is a list of museums, defined for this context as institutions (including nonprofit organizations, government entities, and private businesses) that collect and care for objects of cultural, artistic, scientific, or historical interest and make their collections or related exhibits available for public viewing. Museums that exist only in cyberspace (i.e., virtual museums) are not included.

Museums

Defunct Museums

 Russian Orthodox Museum, Anchorage, closed in 2009
Alaska Heritage Museum by Wells Fargo, Anchorage

See also
Aquaria in Alaska
Botanical gardens in Alaska
Historic landmarks in Alaska
Houses in Alaska
Forts in Alaska
Museum list
Nature Centers in Alaska
Observatories in Alaska
Registered Historic Places in Alaska

References

External links
State of Alaska: Guide to Alaska Museums, listed by city
Alaska Photos

 
Museums
Alaska
Museums